Fanfare of Marriage is a 1953 West German comedy film directed by Hans Grimm and starring Dieter Borsche, Georg Thomalla and Inge Egger. It is the sequel to the 1951 German film Fanfares of Love. It was shot at the Bavaria Studios in Munich and on location around Genoa and Naples in Italy. The film's sets were designed by the art directors Fritz Lück and Hans Sohnle.

Synopsis
While their musician wives are away working on a cruise ship, their husbands are forced to dress up in drag and pretend to be woman in order to convince the social services that they are able to look after their children properly.

Cast
 Dieter Borsche as Hans Mertens
 Georg Thomalla as Peter Schmidt
 Inge Egger as Gaby Mertens
 Fita Benkhoff as Daisy van Roy
 Ilse Petri as Sabine Schmidt
 Doris Kirchner as Pat
 Karl Schönböck as Dobler
 Hubert von Meyerinck as Hornisse
 Paul Henckels as Kapitän
 Rudolf Vogel as Wurm
 Margarete Haagen as Schwester Rosmarie
 Liesl Karlstadt as Rebecca
 Lina Carstens as Mrs. Yell
 Bruno Hübner as Arzt

References

Bibliography 
  Terri Ginsberg & Andrea Mensch. A Companion to German Cinema. John Wiley & Sons, 2012.

External links 
 

1953 films
1953 comedy films
German comedy films
West German films
1950s German-language films
Films directed by Hans Grimm
Cross-dressing in film
German sequel films
German black-and-white films
1950s German films